Cerqueira is a Portuguese surname.

The Cerqueira Family has its origins best known as coming from Portugal, more
specifically from Camposa, in the parish of Vale, in the termo of Arcos de Valdevez around
from the 14th century.

Its primary origin is Jewish. Levites Sephardim coming from the East settled in the
region of the Iberian Peninsula, it is not known exactly when, because the documents of the Jewish origins from this family are sparse because of the persecution that followed with the Portuguese Inquisition initiated on May 23 and 1536.

History

In the Holy Bible in the book of 1 Chronicles 26, 2-19 we have the list of the names of the Guards of the
Temple. Since these Levites were not priests, their function was to protect, maintain and
transport from the tabernacle of Adonai.
When king Solomon inaugurated the first temple (1 Kings 8, 62–66) those of the lineages of these
Temple guard families continued their Levitical roles from generation to generation.
Past the Babylonian exile of the People of Israel, occurred approximately 609 BCE to 515
BCE, and with the establishment of the second temple, many of these family lines
continued their services.

With the destruction of the second temple in 70 CE came the dispersion of the Jews throughout
the Roman territory. These Jews began to settle in small colonies throughout Europe (at that time much of the Roman territory).
Those who settled in the north (today Germany and Russia) developed their
particularities and became known as Ashkenazis Jews. The term comes from Hebrew
medieval for Germany, called Ashkenaz (אשכנז).
The Sephardim (in Hebrew ספרדים, Sephardi; plural, Sephardim) is the term used to refer to the descendants of Jews from Portugal and Spain. The word comes from the
Hebrew name for the Iberian Peninsula (Sepharad, ספרד.)
The lineages of temple guards who went to Portugal were known as Sekher
(transliteration from Hebrew to dam), סכר in Hebrew. 
With the anti-Semitism and persecutions by the Catholics who recaptured the region around
of the 12th century, many Jews changed their surnames even before the official beginning.
of the inquisition.

To maintain part of their origins and blend in with non-Jews the Sekher changed their
names for Sequeira, Siqueira, Cerqueira, etc. . All these variations arose due to spelling errors when it came time to officially document something in the notary offices of the time. Of that form giving rise to the various branches of families the aforementioned signs and many more.
The Cerqueira family mixed with the Portuguese population and after generations they had many of their
members truly converting to Christianity and often turning away from
its Jewish origins.

In the book Nobuario das Familias de Portugal, we have the following: “Franco Moniz Cerqueira, took the coat of arms of the Cerqueiras in which justified his ancestry in 1530 before Dr. Luiz Teixeira passed the Letter in 30
of March, whose justification is found in the Archivo da Caza de Alvellos de Amarante”.
His coat of arms being a "Golden Rampant Lion with a collar around his neck, in a shield
red”.

The collared lion means loyalty (in this case to the King of Portugal) and as a way of legitimizing
his place in the Portuguese nobility, even though he is of Jewish origin (New Christian).

With the establishment of the Portuguese Inquisition by the Catholic Church, we find dozens of
Cerqueira's condemned for the practice of Judaism. In the files of the inquisition in the Tower of
Tombo de Portugal  we find, for example, the processes of Helena de Cerqueira ,
Margarida Cerqueira , Lucrécia de Cerqueira , Bernarda de Cerqueira , Isabela da Fonseca (daughter de Brás Coelho de Cerqueira), Luís da Silva (spouse of Maria de Cerqueira) and many others,
all convicted of the crime of practicing Judaism.
In the book “Portuguese Inquisition”
we find the list of new Christians from the Azores, among them Dias Cerqueira, a farmer.
With the discovery of the Americas, many of these ventured into the “new world”. Being one
of those Vicente Cerqueira who, leaving the Azores in Portugal, settled in Ilhéus in
Bahia Brazil. From his relationship with Monica Fernandes, Alfredo Fernandes Cerqueira was born (1889), farmer.

Notable people with the surname include:

Washington Stecanela Cerqueira (Washington) Brazilian (1975) footballer
Flávio Cerqueira (1985) Portuguese footballer
Carolina Cerqueira Angolan politician, Minister of Social Communication
Ayres Cerqueira Simao (1988) Brazilian football player
Helder Diegues Cerqueira de Souza (1963) Portuguese professor of architecture
José Alves de Cerqueira César (1835-1911) Brazilian politician, governor of the State of São Paulo

See also
Cerqueira César a municipality in the state of São Paulo in Brazil
Dionísio Cerqueira a municipality in the state of Santa Catarina in the South region of Brazil

References

Portuguese-language surnames